is a Japanese sex comedy manga series created by Kazuki Funatsu. It was originally published as a webcomic through Funatsu's Twitter account starting in March 2017, and has since been published by Kadokawa Shoten in two collected tankōbon volumes. A two-part novelization and a live-action adaptation were released in 2018, and an anime television series adaptation by Adonero aired from October to December 2020.

The series follows Suwaru Doge, a man who bows in front of young women while asking to see their underwear or breasts, and focuses on their reactions to him. The webcomic serialization of the manga was popular with readers, while the critical reception varied, praising the visuals but sometimes criticizing the writing.

Premise
Dogeza is a sex comedy, and follows , a man who bows (dogeza) in front of young women and asks them to show him their underwear or breasts, bowing deeper and deeper until they listen to his request; the women react to his actions with astonishment, embarrassment, and confusion. Doge himself is rarely actually visible, as the series instead focuses on the female cast.

Production and release
The manga is created by Kazuki Funatsu, and was originally published irregularly as a webcomic through Funatsu's Twitter account, starting on March 18, 2017, as a hobby to the side of his main business. Funatsu sold two print collections of chapters at Comic Market in 2017 and 2018, and two compiled tankōbon volumes of the series were released by Kadokawa Shoten between March 30, 2018 and March 29, 2021 under its MF Comics imprint. A Chinese edition was published on August 1, 2019 by Kadokawa Taiwan.

Volumes

Related media

A two-part novelization of the series was published by Bishoujo Bunko in 2018: volume 1 on June 18, and volume 2 on November 16. Both were written by Yagi Honjo and illustrated by Funatsu.

An erotic live-action adaptation by the studio Muku was released on October 13, 2018, featuring actresses Minori Kotani, Yui Hatano, Miku Abeno, Seri Hoshi, Mihina Nagai, Yuri Asada, Aya Miyazaki, Hibiki Ōtsuki, Yukari Miyazawa, Mari Takasugi, Ai Mukai, Ruka Kanae, and Nimo.

Anime
A series of anime shorts adapting the series was produced by Adonero and directed by Shinpei Nagai, with character designs by Harabote, background art by Ami Takasusuki, and color by Akira Nagasaka. The sound was produced at Dax Production and directed by Masakatsu Oomuro, while the music was produced at DMM Music and composed by no_my. Nagai was also in charge of the animatics work for the series. The episodes end with art cards of the characters by various artists: these include Jonsun, Saisou, Unasaka, Kaisen Chuui, Harimoji, Kujo Ichiso, Neibi, Oryou, Yanyo, Sakiyamama, Nishida, and Funatsu.

Funatsu was surprised when approached about the adaptation, and said in July 2020 that he could not believe that it would happen; The Fandom Post commented that it is rare for adult manga to be adapted for a mainstream platform. The anime was announced in July 2020 by Gakken's Megami Magazine, and aired from October 14 to December 30, 2020 on AT-X, and ran for 12 episodes. Crunchyroll streamed the anime with English subtitles. The series was released on Blu-ray on December 23, 2020 in Japan, with the censorship from the broadcast version removed, an additional OVA episode, a soundtrack album, and, depending on retailer, one of a number of illustrations of the female cast showing their breasts or underwear.

The main cast was announced in August 2020, and includes Tomokazu Sugita as Suwaru Doge; Kazuma Horie as the Heavenly Voice; and Yui Ogura, Juri Nagatsuma, Miyu Tomita, Ayaka Shimizu, Saika Kitamori as the female cast, playing 2–3 characters each, while Akane Kaida plays as one. Shimizu and Kaida thought it was exciting to get to act in sexy and embarrassing scenes, and Kitamori liked getting to use her experience with living on Kyushu for one of her characters who speaks with a Hakata dialect. The theme song, "Dogeza! Do Get That", was performed by Ogura, Sugita, Kitamori and Kaida as their characters, credited as the group "Dogeza-tai". This marked Kaida's first time recording a character song, and Kitamori's first time recording music in general; Kitamori enjoyed the opportunity, whereas Kaida expressed a feeling of relief after having finished the recording.

Episode list

Reception
Although the series was well received in Japan, with its web serialization being popular with readers on Twitter, it was less popular internationally. GNN recommended the series to readers interested in the topic, calling it visually appealing with well done coloring. Comic Book Resources like the series' premise, and wrote that the series makes good use of the manga format, with its first-person perspective.

Anime Anime thought that the format of the anime adaptation worked well, as one can watch several of the short episodes in one sitting, although Comic Book Resources noted that the anime had a hard time adapting the manga's point-of-view presentation. The Fandom Post was critical of the series, calling it "trashy" and full of bad messages, but well animated and having "just stunning" ending artwork for the episodes. They heavily panned episode 8, where Doge pretends to be a baby, as "a whole new level of embarrassing in a big way", but still found it funny to see Kanan turn things on Doge in episode 3, and thought the book talk in the beginning of episode 4 was cute.

See also
Addicted to Curry, a manga series by the same author
Yokai Girls, a manga series by the same author
Sundome!! Milky Way, a manga series by the same author

Notes

References

External links
  
 
 

2017 webcomic debuts
2018 Japanese novels
Anime series based on manga
AT-X (TV network) original programming
Japanese comedy webcomics
Kadokawa Shoten manga
Light novels
Seinen manga
Sex comedy anime and manga
Television shows based on Japanese webcomics
Webcomics in print
Japanese sex comedy films
2018 films
2010s Japanese-language films